Nidirana is a genus of true frogs (Ranidae) from East and Southeast Asia. They are commonly known as music frogs. This genus contains numerous species that were formerly classified in the genus Babina, which is thought to be its sister genus.

Species 
The following species are recognized within Nidirana:

 Nidirana adenopleura (Boulenger, 1909)
 Nidirana chapaensis (Bourret, 1937)
 Nidirana daunchina (Chang, 1933)
 Nidirana guangdongensis Lyu, Wan, and Wang, 2020
 Nidirana guangxiensis Mo, Lyu, Huang, Liao, and Wang, 2021
 Nidirana hainanensis (Fei, Ye, and Jiang, 2007)
 Nidirana leishanensis Li, Wei, Xu, Cui, Fei, Jiang, Liu, and Wang, 2019
 Nidirana lini (Chou, 1999)
 Nidirana mangveni Lyu, Qi, and Y.-y. Wang, 2020
 Nidirana nankunensis Lyu, Zeng, Wang, Lin, Liu, and Wang, 2017
 Nidirana occidentalis Lyu, Yang, and Wang, 2020
 Nidirana okinavana (Boettger, 1895)
 Nidirana pleuraden (Boulenger, 1904)
 Nidirana shiwandashanensis Chen, Peng, Li, and Liu, 2022
 Nidirana xiangica Lyu and Wang, 2020
 Nidirana yaoica Lyu, Mo, Wan, Li, Pang, and Wang, 2019
 Nidirana yeae Wei, Li, Liu, Cheng, Xu, and Wang, 2020

References 
 

Nidirana
Amphibians of Asia
Amphibian genera